The Guards Cavalry Division (Garde-Kavallerie-Division) was a unit of the Prussian Army that was stationed in Berlin. The division was a part of the Guards Corps (Gardekorps).

Pre-war Order of Battle 
Before the outbreak of World War I, the component units of the division were:

 1st Guards Cavalry Brigade
Gardes du Corps
Guards Cuirassiers
 2nd Guards Cavalry Brigade
1st Guards Uhlans
3rd Guards Uhlans
 3rd Guards Cavalry Brigade
1st Guards Dragoons "Queen of Great Britain and Ireland"
2nd Guards Dragoons "Empress Alexandra of Russia"
 4th Guards Cavalry Brigade
Life Guards Hussars
2nd Guards Uhlans

Combat chronicle 
The division was initially assigned to I Cavalry Corps, which preceded the 3rd Army on the Western Front. It served on the Western Front until December 1914, then undertook frontier guard duties against Holland until 30 June 1915, when it relocated to Russia. From 16 March 1918 to 9 April 1918, it was dismounted, re-formed and trained on the Zossen troop training ground. Thereafter, it served as the Guard Cavalry Schützen Division on the Western Front. It was in Artois until May 1918, then Champagne / Aisne. By the end of the war, it was serving under VI Reserve Corps, 1st Army, Heeresgruppe Deutscher Kronprinz on the Western Front.

A more detailed combat chronicle can be found at the German-language version of this article.

Order of Battle on mobilisation 
Upon the outbreak of war, the 4th Guards Cavalry Brigade was dissolved and its component regiments were assigned as divisional cavalry to the 1st Guards Infantry Division (Life Guard Hussars) and 2nd Guards Infantry Division (2nd Guard Uhlans). With the addition of support units, the Division's structure was:

1st Guards Cavalry Brigade
Gardes du Corps
Guards Cuirassiers
2nd Guards Cavalry Brigade
1st Guards Uhlans
3rd Guards Uhlans
3rd Guards Cavalry Brigade
1st Guards Dragoons "Queen of Great Britain and Ireland"
2nd Guards Dragoons "Empress Alexandra of Russia"
Horse Artillery Abteilung of the 1st Guards Field Artillery Regiment
1st Guard Machine Gun Detachment
Pioneer Detachment
Signals Detachment
Heavy Wireless Station 2
Light Wireless Station 1
Light Wireless Station 2
Cavalry Motorised Vehicle Column 10

See: Table of Organisation and Equipment

Guard Cavalry Schützen Division 

The Guard Cavalry Division was extensively reorganised in the course of the war, culminating in the conversion to a Cavalry Schützen Division, that is to say, dismounted cavalry. Here, the cavalry brigades were renamed Cavalry Schützen Commands and performed a similar role to that of an infantry regiment command. Likewise, the cavalry regiments became Cavalry Schützen Regiments and allocated the role of an infantry battalion (and their squadrons acted as infantry companies). However, these units were much weaker than normal infantry formations (for example, a Schützen squadron had a strength of just 4 officers and 109 NCOs and other ranks, considerably less than that of an infantry company).
1st Guards Cavalry Brigade became independent on 9 April 1917
2nd Guards Cavalry Brigade became independent on 6 June 1916
3rd Guards Cavalry Brigade became independent on 18 October 1916
19th Cavalry Brigade joined from 9th Cavalry Division on 8 April 1917 and became independent on 12 February 1918
11th Cavalry Brigade joined from 5th Cavalry Division on 23 March 1918 and renamed 11th Cavalry Schützen Command on 8 May 1918
14th Cavalry Brigade joined from 9th Cavalry Division on 23 February 1918 and renamed 14th Cavalry Schützen Command on 8 May 1918
38th Cavalry Brigade joined from 8th Cavalry Division on 20 April 1918 and renamed 38th Cavalry Schützen Command on 8 May 1918

Late World War I organization 
Allied Intelligence rated this division as 2nd Class (of 4 classes). Its late war organisation was:

5th Landwehr Brigade
11th Cavalry Schützen Command
Guards Cuirassiers
1st (Silesian) Life Cuirassiers "Great Elector"
8th (2nd Silesian) Dragoons "King Frederick III"
14th Cavalry Schützen Command
4th (1st Silesian) Hussars "von Schill"
11th (2nd Westphalian) Hussars
5th (Westphalian) Uhlans
38th Cavalry Schützen Command
4th (Westphalian) Cuirassiers "von Driesen"
2nd Jäger zu Pferde
6th Jäger zu Pferde
1st Guard MG Detachment
1st Squadron, 5th Jäger zu Pferde (mounted cavalry)
132nd Artillery Command
3rd Guards Field Artillery
722nd Light Ammunition Column
852nd Light Ammunition Column
1135th Light Ammunition Column
412th Pioneer Battalion
2nd Ersatz Company, 18th Pioneer Battalion
307th Pioneer Company
226th Signal Command
226th Telephone Detachment
183rd Wireless Detachment
Medical and Veterinary
257th Ambulance Company
642nd Ambulance Company
1st Field Hospital
302nd Field Hospital
262nd Vet. Hospital
Train
636th Motor Transport Column

See also 

German Army (German Empire)
German cavalry in World War I
German Army order of battle (1914)

References

External links  
 Histories of two hundred and fifty-one divisions of the German army which participated in the war (1914-1918) pp. 29–32.

Bibliography 
 
 
 
 

Cavalry divisions of Germany in World War I
Military units and formations established in 1914
Military units and formations disestablished in 1919